Efate is an island in the Pacific Ocean which is part of the Shefa Province in Vanuatu. It is also known as Île Vate.

Geography 
It is the most populous (approx. 66,000) island in Vanuatu. Efate's land area of  makes it Vanuatu's third largest island. Its geological past was heavily volcanic, meaning that a lava shelf surrounds much of the island. Most inhabitants of Efate live in Port Vila, the national capital.

History 

During World War II, Efate served an important role as a United States military base.

On March 13, 2015, Port Vila, the island's largest human settlement and the capital of Vanuatu, bore extensive damage from Cyclone Pam.

Politics
Efate became an independent commune in 1889 when residents declared the region as Franceville. However, by 1890 the commune was broken up.

Efate is governed by both the Port Vila Municipality and the Shefa Provincial Council, whose governance is the town limits of Port Vila only, and rural Efate and the outer Efate Islands, respectively.

The Island outside of Port Vila is represented in Parliament by the five-seat riding of Efate. Port Vila has its own five-seat riding. These ten MPs are elected through Single non-transferable voting.

Small Islands off Efate 

Around Efate lie many small islands, among them are Eretoka (Hat) Island, Lelepa, Nguna, Pele, Ekapum Lep, Erueti Lep, Ekapum Rik, Iriwiti Lep, Hideaway Island, Ifira Island, and Emao.  Eretoka Island is a small island that, when seen from a distance looks like a floppy hat.  This is where the famous Chief Roi Mata, along with his 20 wives and many other servants, were buried. Nguna, Pele and Emao are stratovolcanoes, which may form the rim of a volcanic caldera to their north.

Survivor 
Efate was used as the location for three seasons of the reality game show, Survivor. The island was used for season 9 of the American edition of Survivor  (titled Survivor: Vanuatu - Islands of Fire), season 2 of Australian Survivor (titled Australian Celebrity Survivor: Vanuatu) and season 6 of  the French edition (titled Koh-Lanta: Vanuatu). Much of the Survivor: Vanuatu and Australian Celebrity Survivor was filmed approximately 30 minutes from Port Vila near Mangililu and Gideon's Landing, the latter of which is now a commonly visited tourist attraction.

Tourism

The capital of Port Vila is the hub of tourism in Vanuatu receiving approximately 60 000 tourists annually by air transport, cruise ships and the yachting community. Due to the British and French influence both cuisines are readily available in the capital. Budget dining include the scattered Chinese eateries across Vila and the Mummas Market downtown. Outside of Port Vila a more rustic destination awaits, with most people living a traditional lifestyle: cooking island food or 'aelan kakae', tending their gardens daily as subsistence agriculture is the dominant economy in Vanuatu, and swimming at the beach.

Port Vila services the domestic carrier Air Vanuatu which goes to the outer islands of Vanuatu. Popular destinations such as Tanna and Santo can be reached daily from Port Vila, while more remote locations can be reached on a less regular basis. The island is served by Bauerfield International Airport.

Efate offers a range of tourism attractions and activities including Mele Cascades, Eton Beach, Tanalilui Road Markets,  Round Island Tour, Buggy Fun Rental, Diving and Sunset Cruises.

Notable people 

 Litiana Kalsrap - climate activist and youth leader

See also
Pango, Vanuatu

References

External links

Languages of Efate - Bibliography of the island's indigenous languages
South Efate language Wikipedia entry.
Work on Efate is available through Paradisec's open access collections, including collections from Arther Capell and Nick Thieburger.

Islands of Vanuatu
Shefa Province
Volcanoes of Vanuatu